This is a list of public art in the Royal Borough of Greenwich.


Avery Hill

Blackheath

Charlton

Deptford

Eltham

Greenwich

Greenwich Peninsula

Lee

Plumstead

Shooter's Hill

Thamesmead

Woolwich

References

Bibliography

External links
 

Greenwich
Greenwich
Tourist attractions in the Royal Borough of Greenwich